Amy Fowler may refer to:

 Amy Farrah Fowler, a character on the TV series The Big Bang Theory
 Amy Goldman Fowler (born 1954), gardener, author and advocate for seed saving
 Amy Fowler, a character in the film High Noon, played by Grace Kelly